Witchfinder General was an English heavy metal band from Stourbridge. They were part of the new wave of British heavy metal scene and have been cited as a major influence on the doom metal genre. They were named after the 1968 British horror film Witchfinder General.

History

Witchfinder General formed in 1979 by Zeeb Parkes and Phil Cope in Stourbridge, England, as part of the new wave of British heavy metal movement during the early 1980s. They were strongly influenced by Black Sabbath, and have been described as one of the pioneers of the doom metal style. The band's importance was acknowledged mostly after they disbanded. Witchfinder General disbanded sometime in 1984 amidst reported controversy of their sexually explicit album covers in the UK.

The band (minus vocalist and writer Zeeb Parkes) reformed in November 2006-- with new vocalist Gary Martin. The band released Buried Amongst the Ruins a compilation CD featuring the "Burning a Sinner" single, the Soviet Invasion EP, and four live tracks including a live version of the unreleased track "Phantasmagorical" in 2006. The band released their third full-length album  Resurrected in 2008.

Members
 Phil Cope – guitar (1979–1984, 2006–2008), bass (1982)
 Johnny Fisher – bass (1979–1980)
 Steve Kinsell – drums (1979–1982)
 Zeeb Parkes – vocals (1979–1984)
 Kevin McCready – bass (1981–1982; died 2008)
 Graham Ditchfield – drums (1982–1983)
 Rod Hawkes - bass (1982–1984, 2006–2008)
 Dermot Redmond – drums (1983–1984, 2006–2008)
 Gary Martin – vocals (2006–2008)

Timeline

Discography

Studio albums
 Death Penalty (1982)
 Friends of Hell (1983)
 Resurrected (2008)

Live albums
 Live '83 (2006)

Singles and EPs
 "Burning a Sinner" (1981)
 Soviet Invasion (1982)
 "Music" (1983)

Other releases
 Buried Amongst the Ruins (2007)

See also
List of new wave of British heavy metal bands

References

External links
 Official website
 

English doom metal musical groups
Musical groups established in 1979
Musical groups disestablished in 1984
Musical groups reestablished in 2006
Musical groups disestablished in 2008
Musical quartets
New Wave of British Heavy Metal musical groups